João Bosco de Freitas Mucci, known professionally as João Bosco is a Brazilian singer-songwriter and guitarist.  In the 1970s he established his reputation in música popular Brasileira (Portuguese: "Brazilian pop music") with lyricist Aldir Blanc.

Born on July 13, 1946, in Ponte Nova, Minas Gerais, Bosco's profession was engineering when he moved to Rio de Janeiro, where his songs were recorded by Elis Regina. In the introduction to his three-volume Songbook, Almir Chediak wrote, "Brilliant composer João Bosco's melodic and harmonic constructions are among the most auspicious in Brazilian music."
Chapter Five of Masters of Contemporary Brazilian Song: MPB 1965-1985 by Charles A. Perrone is dedicated to the work of Bosco and Blanc.

His father was Lebanese.

Notable compositions
 "O Bêbado e a Equilibrista"
 "Papel Mache"
 "Corsário"
 "O Mestre Sala dos Mares"
 "Kid Cavaquinho"
 "Latin Lover"
 "Jade"
 "Incompatibilidade de Gênios"

Discography
 1972: Disco de Bolso (Pasquim)
 1973: João Bosco
 1975: Caça à Raposa
 1976: Galos de Briga
 1977: Disco de Ouro with Aldir Blanc
 1977: Tiro de Misericórdia
 1979: Linha de Passe
 1980: Bandalhismo
 1981: Essa É a Sua Vida
 1982: Comissão de Frente
 1983: João Bosco ao Vivo
 1984: Gagabirô
 1986: Cabeça de Nego
 1987: Ai Ai Ai de Mim
 1989: Bosco
 1991: Zona de Fronteira
 1992: Acústico MTV
 1994: Na Onda Que Balança
 1995: Dá Licença Meu Senhor
 1997: As Mil e Uma Aldeias
 1998: Benguelê
 2000: Na Esquina
 2001: João Bosco ao Vivo
 2003: Malabaristas do Sinal Vermelho
 2003: Songbook 1/2/3
 2006: Obrigado Gente! Ao Vivo (Live performance on DVD)
 2010: Senhoras do Amazonas
 2009: Não Vou Pro Céu, Mas Já Não Vivo No Chão
 2012: 40 Anos Depois (CD and DVD)
 2018: Mano Que Zuera
 2020: Abricó-de-Macaco

References

External links
Official website
Biography page at allmusic.com

1946 births
Living people
20th-century Brazilian male singers
20th-century Brazilian singers
Brazilian people of Italian descent
People from Minas Gerais
Música Popular Brasileira guitarists
Brazilian male guitarists
Música Popular Brasileira singers
Latin Grammy Award winners
Latin Grammy Lifetime Achievement Award winners
Latin music songwriters
Brazilian people of Lebanese descent